Charles Octavius Swinnerton Morgan DL, JP, FRS, FSA (15 September 1803 – 5 August 1888), known as Octavius Morgan, was a British politician, historian and antiquary. He was a significant benefactor to the British Museum.

Background and education
Morgan was born on 15 September 1803. He was the fourth son of Sir Charles Morgan, 2nd Baronet, of Tredegar Park, Monmouthshire, by his wife Mary (née Stoney). Charles Rodney Morgan and Charles Morgan, 1st Baron Tredegar, were his elder brothers. He was educated at Westminster School in London and at Christ Church, Oxford, gaining an M.A. in 1832.

Career
Morgan was a Fellow of the Society of Antiquaries of London, a Fellow of the Royal Society and the President of the Royal Archaeological Institute. In 1832 he was elected a Fellow of the Royal Society.

Morgan had inherited an ample fortune and in 1839 he had "The Friars" rebuilt for his use in the Elizabethan style. The Friars had at one time been home to Carmelite monks. He was said to have filled the house with "Tudor furniture, more curious than useful". Morgan had an octagonal preaching platform installed halfway up the main wooden staircase where he would conduct services every day. His congregation would consist of his maids, the housekeeper, bailiff and the boot boy. The lock he had installed on the door reflected his interest in mechanisms and automata. The substantial brass lock is still on the door of his house and it has seven subsidiary controls.

Morgan sat as Member of Parliament for Monmouthshire from 1841 to 1874 for the Conservatives. He also served as a Justice of the Peace and Deputy Lieutenant for Monmouthshire. He was President of the Cambrian Archaeological Association 1857–8.
 
He had been elected to Society of Antiquaries but was not active until 1848 after which he was Vice-President more than once. Morgan published papers on astrolabes and episcopal rings and early communion plate.

In 1852 Morgan published a series of papers in the Archaeological Journal about the assay and hallmarking of gold and silver, the first information that had been made public on this ancient practice. These sparked public interest in studying and collecting old gold and silver because of the information about its date and origins that can be discovered from the hallmarks.

In 1872 he published a valuable guide to the monuments in the Priory Church of St Mary in Abergavenny.

During his lifetime Morgan made a number of generous donations to the British Museum including a nef, an extravagant table ornament automaton known as the Mechanical Galleon in 1866.

Morgan never married and died on 5 August 1888 aged 84. He was buried in his family's vault at St Basil's Church at Bassaleg in Monmouthshire. He left his clock collection, astronomical instruments and episcopal rings. His astrolabes included the 14th-century astrolabe used to call the faithful to prayer in Damascus. Morgan's collections of papers including his translations of Welsh poetry are in the National Library of Wales.

A book published at the time and attributed to his fellow MP, Reginald Blewitt, describes Morgan as flippant in his youth and overbearing, arrogant, short and effeminate.

Today his house's extensive dairy and orangery are gone as his home is now (2010) an educational facility for the Welsh National Health Service, but it is said that the house is still adorned with Latin inscriptions hidden within wooden carvings and a grand imported German fireplace bearing his initials.

References

External links
Welsh Biography Online

1803 births
1888 deaths
Younger sons of baronets
Conservative Party (UK) MPs for Welsh constituencies
Members of the Parliament of the United Kingdom for Monmouthshire
UK MPs 1841–1847
UK MPs 1847–1852
UK MPs 1852–1857
UK MPs 1857–1859
UK MPs 1859–1865
UK MPs 1865–1868
UK MPs 1868–1874
Fellows of the Royal Society
Members of the Cambrian Archaeological Association
People associated with the British Museum